The following is an episode list of the WB sitcom The Steve Harvey Show. A total of 122 episodes aired from 1996 to 2002.

Series overview

Episodes

Season 1 (1996–97)

Season 2 (1997–98)

Season 3 (1998–99)

Season 4 (1999–2000)

Season 5 (2000–01)

Season 6 (2001–02)

See also
Steve Harvey
The Steve Harvey Show
List of Award Nominations received by The Steve Harvey Show
The Steve Harvey Morning Show

References

External links

List of The Steve Harvey Show episodes at Sony Pictures Television

Lists of American sitcom episodes